David Auble (born March 13, 1938) is an American wrestler. He was a two-time NCAA wrestling national champion at Cornell University, where he was a member of the Quill and Dagger society. He competed in the men's freestyle bantamweight at the 1964 Summer Olympics.

References

External links
 

1938 births
Living people
American male sport wrestlers
Olympic wrestlers of the United States
Wrestlers at the 1964 Summer Olympics
Sportspeople from Ithaca, New York
Cornell Big Red wrestlers
Pan American Games medalists in wrestling
Pan American Games gold medalists for the United States
Wrestlers at the 1959 Pan American Games